Vilhelm is a masculine given name, the Scandinavian form of William and Wilhelm. Notable people with the name include:

 Vilhelm Ahlmann (1852–1928), Danish-Swedish architect
 Vilhelm Andersen (1864–1953), Danish author, literary historian and intellectual
 Vilhelm Andersson (1891–1933), Swedish water polo player and freestyle swimmer
 Vilhelm Aubert (1922–1988), Norwegian sociologist
 Vilhelm Mariboe Aubert (1868–1908), Norwegian jurist
 Vilhelm Bjerke-Petersen (1909–1957), Danish painter, writer and art theorist
 Vilhelm Bjerknes (1862–1951), Norwegian physicist, founder of modern meteorology
 Vilhelm Bissen (1836–1913), Danish sculptor
 Vilhelm Frimann Christie Bøgh (1817–1888), Norwegian archivist
 Vilhelm Bryde (1888–1974), Swedish actor and art director
 Vilhelm Buhl (1881–1954), Prime Minister of Denmark in 1942 and again in 1945
 Vilhelm Carlberg (1880–1970), Swedish Olympic champion shooter
 Vilhelm Dahlerup (1826–1907), Danish architect
 Vilhelm Dybwad (1863–1950), Norwegian barrister and writer
 Vilhelm Ekelund (1880–1949), Swedish poet
 Vilhelm Evang (1909–1983), Norwegian military officer
 Vilhelm Grønbech (1873–1948), Danish cultural historian and educator
 Vilhelm Groth (1842–1899), Danish landscape painter
 Vilhelm Gylche (1888–1952), Danish track and field athlete
 Vilhelm Hammershøi (1864–1916), Danish painter
 Vilhelm Hansen (1900–1992), Danish children's book author and illustrator
 Vilhelm Helander (born 1941), Finnish architect
 Vilhelm Herold (1865–1937), Danish operatic tenor, voice teacher and theatre director
 Vilhelm Christian Holm (1820–1886), Danish composer
 Vilhelm Hvalsøe (1883–1958), Danish architect
 Johannes Vilhelm Jensen (1873–1950), Danish writer, Nobel Prize laureate
 Vilhelm Johansen (1898–1993), Danish sports shooter
 Vilhelm Jørgensen (1897–1967), Danish footballer
 Vilhelm Klavenæs (19??–19??), Norwegian luger
 Vilhelm Klein (1835–1913), Danish architect
 Vilhelm Krag (1871–1933),Norwegian poet, author, journalist and cultural personality
 Vilhelm Kraus (born 1949), Bulgarian politician
 Vilhelm Kyhn (1819–1903), Danish landscape painter
 Vilhelm Lange (1893–1950), Danish gymnast
 Vilhelm Lauritzen (1894–1984), Danish architect
 Vilhelm Laybourn (1885–1955), Danish modern pentathlete
 Vilhelm Lie (1877–1935), Norwegian civil servant
 Vilhelm Lindgrén (1895–1960), Finnish swimmer
 Anders Vilhelm Lundstedt (1882–1955), Swedish jurist and legislator
 Vilhelm Lundstrøm (1893–1950), Danish modernist painter
 Vilhelm Herman Oluf Madsen (1844–1917), Danish politician, minister, army officer, businessman and inventor
 Vilhelm Mejdell (1904–1989), Norwegian marketing agent and sports official
 Vilhelm Melbye (1824–1882), Danish painter
 Vilhelm Moberg (1898–1973), Swedish author, playwright and historian
 Vilhelm Munk Nielsen (born 1955), Danish footballer
 Vilhelm Pacht (1843–1912), Danish genre painter, industrialist and philanthropist
 Vilhelm Paus (1915–1995), Norwegian lawyer, diplomat and business executive
 Vilhelm Pedersen (1820–1859), Danish painter and illustrator
 Vilhelm Petersen (1812–1880), Danish landscape painter
 Vilhelm Petersen (1830–1913), Danish architect
 Vilhelm Rosenqvist (1856–1925), Finnish secondary school teacher and politician
 Vilhelm Rosenstand (1838–1915), Danish painter and illustrator
 Vilhelm Swedenborg (1869–1943), Swedish military officer, explorer and an aeronaut
 Vilhelm Thomsen (1842–1927), Danish linguist and Turkologist
 Vilhelm Topsøe (1840–1881), Danish novelist and journalist
 Vilhelm Tvede (1826–1891), Danish architect
 Vilhelm Tveteraas (1898–1972), Norwegian printmaker, painter and illustrator
 Vilhelm Uchermann (1852–1929), Norwegian physician, otorhinolaryngologist
 Vilhelm Vett (1879–1962), Danish sport sailor
 Vilhelm Theodor Walther (1819–1892), Danish architect
 Vilhelm Andreas Wexelsen (1849–1909), Norwegian bishop and politician
 Vilhelm Wohlert (1920–2007), was a Danish architect
 Vilhelm Wolfhagen (1889–1958), Danish amateur football player

See also
Guilherme, Portuguese
Villem, Estonian
Wilhelm (name), German
Willem, Dutch
William (name), English

Danish masculine given names
Norwegian masculine given names
Scandinavian masculine given names
Swedish masculine given names
Finnish masculine given names